Boorowa River, a perennial stream that is part of the Lachlan catchment within the Murray–Darling basin, is located in the central–western region of New South Wales, Australia.

Location and features

The river flows through the town of Boorowa, from where it draws its name, an Aboriginal Wiradjuri word for kangaroo.

See also

References

External links

 

Tributaries of the Lachlan River
Rivers of New South Wales